The SAJC Coolmore Classic is a Group 2 Australian thoroughbred horse race for fillies and mares aged 3 years old and over, over a distance of 1600 m. It is held at Morphettville Racecourse in Adelaide in April. Before 2006 it was held in May.

History

1980 onwards held over 1600 m.

1980 – 1984 was a Listed Race
1985 – 1986 was a Group 3
1987 onwards Group 2

1980 - 1990 the race was known as the ‘Queen of the South Stakes’
1991 - 1992 the race was known as the ‘Southwark Premium Classic’
1993 - 1999 the race was known as the ‘Sedgwick Classic’
2000 - 2005 the race was known as the ‘Marsh Classic’
2006 onwards the race has been called the ‘Coolmore Classic’.

Winners
	2008	-	Trick Of Light
	2007	-	Cinque Cento
	2006	-	Open Cut
	2005	-	Hidden Strings
	2004	-	Jameela
	2003	-	Sylvaner
	2002	-	Sylvaner
	2001	-	Lady Marion
	2000	-	La Zoffany
	1999	-	Noircir
	1998	-	Spectrum
	1997	-	Miss Tessla
	1996	-	Saleous
	1995	-	Our Marquise
	1994	-	Ausmart
	1993	-	San Pauli Girl
	1992	-	Shavano Miss
	1991	-	Shavano Miss
	1990	-	Memphis Blues
	1989	-	Memphis Blues
	1988	-	Adraanito
	1987	-	Goblet
	1986	-	Canny Lass
	1985	-	Star Style Girl
	1984	-	Casey Belle
	1983	-	Corona Miss
	1982	-	Rose Of Kingston
	1981	-	Parisian Romp
	1980	-	Golden Kingdom

References
Australian Studbook - SAJC Coolmore Classic Race Winners

Horse races in Australia